Qasemabad-e Akhavan (also Romanized as Qāsemābād-e Ākhavān; also known as Qāsemābād) is a village in Behnamvasat-e Shomali Rural District, in the Central District of Varamin County, Tehran Province, Iran. At the 2006 census, its population was 77, in 21 families.

References 

Populated places in Varamin County